Caroline Mary Aherne (24 December 1963 – 2 July 2016) was an English actress, comedian and writer. She was best known for performing as the acerbic chat show host Mrs Merton, in various roles in The Fast Show, and as Denise in The Royle Family (1998–2012), a series which she co-wrote. She won BAFTA awards for her work on The Mrs Merton Show and The Royle Family.

Aherne narrated the Channel 4 reality television series Gogglebox from its inception in 2013 until 8 April 2016. Aherne died of cancer at the age of 52.

Early life
Aherne was born in Ealing, London, on 24 December 1963, the second child of Irish parents Bartholomew Edmond "Bert" Aherne, a railwayman with London Transport, and Mary Frances "Maureen" Aherne (née Regan). From the age of two, Aherne was brought up in Wythenshawe, Manchester. Like her brother, Patrick, Aherne had retinoblastoma in childhood, which left her partially sighted in one eye.

She attended the Hollies Convent FCJ School in West Didsbury and then studied drama at Liverpool Polytechnic.

Career

Early career
Aherne began performing on the Manchester comedy circuit as characters such as Mitzi Goldberg, lead singer of the comedy country and western act the Mitzi Goldberg Experience, and Sister Mary Immaculate, an Irish nun.

The Mrs Merton character originated as a voice on the 1988 Frank Sidebottom album titled 5:9:88, after Aherne worked as a receptionist for his show on Piccadilly Radio. Aherne was then invited by DJ Martin Kelner to develop the character on his show, where she would spend many years appearing as a comedy agony aunt across the north of England on the BBC Night Network.

In 1990 Aherne became a late night radio presenter on KFM Radio in Stockport, joining a line-up which included Craig Cash as well as Jon Ronson, Spence MacDonnald and The Word's Terry Christian.

Aherne's first TV appearances were as Mrs Merton in a semi-regular spot on the Granada TV discussion show Upfront in 1990. After that Mrs Merton became the regular celebrity interviewer on Granada's Saturday morning show Express!, a youth TV programme presented by I Am Kloot's John 'Johnny Dangerously' Bramwell and Sumy Kuraishe from a number of random locations in the north west. In 1992, Aherne appeared as Mrs Merton in the local Yorkshire Television series, Frank’s Fantastic Shed Show, with Chris Sievey in his Frank Sidebottom persona. For this Leeds-based ITV station Aherne had recorded a pilot of Mrs Murton's Nightcap, but they had not pursued the concept. In 1993, she made brief appearances in The Smell of Reeves and Mortimer and alongside Steve Coogan and John Thomson in a Granada TV pilot entitled The Dead Good Show.

She rose to prominence in 1994 as her created character Mrs Merton on the mock chat show The Mrs Merton Show under her married name of Caroline Hook. The guests were real-life celebrities, not actors, who found themselves the subject of outrageous faux-naïf questions – in one memorable example the wife of magician Paul Daniels, Debbie McGee, was asked "So, what first attracted you to the millionaire Paul Daniels?" - while a regular audience of pensioners were used each week for Mrs Merton to bounce questions off.

Another episode featured comedian Bernard Manning and actor Richard Wilson. Manning clashed with Wilson and Aherne as she asked him about his racist attitudes at one point saying, “Who do you vote for now Hitler's dead?”, although he acknowledged that One Foot in the Grave was funny. The series ran in various formats from 1994 to 1997, winning a BAFTA for Best Talk Show in 1997. The success of the show was partly attributed to the "round vowel sounds of the North West accent" which "naturally sound safe and unthreatening" and which allowed the character "to ask the most outrageous, below-the-belt questions of her guest stars".

The Mrs Merton character was given a sitcom, Mrs Merton and Malcolm, which depicted her home life with her "mummy's boy" son (played by co-writer Craig Cash). This aspect of Malcolm's character was exaggerated to the point that many complained the series ridiculed those with learning difficulties. Mrs Merton and Malcolm lasted one series, and was released on DVD in 2008.

Between 1994 and 1997 she appeared in and wrote for the BBC comedy series The Fast Show. One of her most notable characters was the "Chanel 9 Neus" meteorologist Poula Fisch, who invariably reported a temperature for all locations of 45 °C (113 °F) while exclaiming "Scorchio!" with apparent surprise. Other characters included the endlessly chattering northern Renée, wife of submissive husband Roy and supermarket Checkout Girl who, by way of conversation, would comment nosily and judgementally on each item a customer had bought.

The Royle Family
Aherne's most popular creation is the situation comedy The Royle Family, which she co-created and wrote with Cash, and directed in its third series. The programme ran for three series from 1998 to 2000. Aherne starred alongside Ricky Tomlinson and Sue Johnston, as their daughter Denise Royle. The show was a commercial and critical success, and ran for three series with a total of 20 episodes as well as five one-offs made for showing at Christmas. After a 2000 spoof documentary with Cash entitled Back Passage to India, Aherne said The Royle Family would end in December 2000 after a Christmas special, and that she would not appear on television again, although she would continue to write. Aherne received BAFTAs for Best Sitcom in 2000 and 2007, and she won the BAFTA for Best Comedy Performance in 2000. She was nominated for directing in 2001.

Later career
Following a disagreement with Cash, Aherne moved to Australia, retreating from the press. She wrote Dossa and Joe which was screened on BBC Two in 2002. Although critics applauded it, the show failed to attract viewers and did not return for a second series. Returning to Britain, she began work on another sitcom with Cash, but pulled out, after which Cash wrote Early Doors with Phil Mealey; Aherne was listed in the credits in the "Thanks To" section.

After Dossa and Joe, Aherne avoided media attention. When The Fast Show was featured on the BBC One show Comedy Connections, Aherne was the only cast member not interviewed. In April 2006, the BBC said Aherne and Cash were developing a script for a one-off special of The Royle Family. The Royle Family: The Queen of Sheba was broadcast on 29 October 2006, to an audience of 7.8 million. Aherne subsequently made few TV appearances. On 14 October 2008, she appeared in the BBC comedy drama Sunshine, written by Cash and Phil Mealey, as a barmaid. She appeared in The Royle Family special "The New Sofa" on Christmas Day 2008. In 2009, she appeared in another special for Comic Relief, as well as another Christmas Day special entitled "The Golden Eggcup". 

She co-wrote the ITV comedy-drama The Fattest Man in Britain, which was broadcast in December 2009. In November 2010, Aherne appeared in the special The Royle Family: Behind the Sofa shown on Gold, featuring clips of The Royle Family and interviews with Aherne, Cash and the cast, which was followed by another Christmas Day special, "Joe's Crackers". She narrated a BBC1 documentary series Pound Shop Wars broadcast in November 2012. She also appeared in The Fast Show internet specials, sponsored by the lager brand Fosters, which reunited most of the original principal cast; only Mark Williams was unable to participate.

Aherne wrote the 2013 one-off sitcom The Security Men, along with Jeff Pope for ITV. The episode starred Paddy McGuinness, Brendan O'Carroll, Dean Andrews, Bobby Ball and Peter Wight.

Aherne's final major role was as narrator of the Channel 4 comedy reality series Gogglebox, reflecting her character in The Royle Family, who would frequently be watching TV and commenting on it. Cash filled in when she was unavailable and took over the role permanently in April 2016.

Aherne's final on-screen appearance came in the Sky One show After Hours, where she was reunited with Cash who produced and directed the show. She played the role of Sheila.

Personal life, illness and death
Aherne was married to Peter Hook of the bands Joy Division and New Order from 1994 until 1997. During their marriage, he appeared in her TV series The Mrs Merton Show as leader of Hooky & the Boys, the show's house band. After her death, Hook said that he was repeatedly physically abused by Aherne during their marriage. Charities supporting victims of domestic violence welcomed his statements.

Aherne struggled with depression and alcoholism. Before The Royle Family began, she suffered from depression and attempted suicide in July 1998 after the death of her former boyfriend, BBC technician Matt Bowers, from stomach cancer in 1997 and the end of a relationship with American actor, Alexis Denisof. She checked in to the Priory, where she was diagnosed as a binge alcoholic.

She suffered from bladder cancer and a rare cancer of the retina. In 2014, she embarked on a programme of treatment for lung cancer. In June 2014, Aherne appeared in Manchester at the launch of the Macmillan Cancer Improvement Partnership (MCIP), a £3.4m scheme to co-ordinate cancer care in the city. She spoke about how a sense of humour had helped her cope with the disease. In 2016, Aherne became the voice behind the UK government's "One You" health campaign, to persuade people to cut down on cigarettes and alcohol.

On the morning of 2 July 2016, Aherne died of lung cancer at her home in Timperley aged 52. Aherne had told family and close friends in May that she was terminally ill. Her funeral took place on 14 July 2016. Many friends and co-stars were also in attendance.

In October 2016, Steve Coogan paid tribute to Aherne at the Stand Up to Cancer 2016 event, speaking about her before a video was played of her TV moments, and then Noel Gallagher's High Flying Birds performed The Royle Family theme tune "Half the World Away".

Filmography

Awards

References

External links

Caroline Aherne at the British Film Institute
Caroline Aherne biography and credits at BFI Screenonline
Caroline Aherne pictures at Universal Search
Obituary: Caroline Aherne, BBC News, 2 July 2016

1963 births
2016 deaths
20th-century British businesspeople
20th-century English comedians
20th-century English women
20th-century English people
21st-century English comedians
21st-century English women
Actresses from Manchester
Alumni of Liverpool John Moores University
Best Comedy Performance BAFTA Award (television) winners
British women television producers
British television producers
Comedians from Manchester
Deaths from lung cancer in England
English people of Irish descent
English television actresses
English television directors
English television producers
English television writers
English women comedians
The Fast Show
People from Ealing
People from Wythenshawe
British women television writers
Writers from Manchester